Nik Speakman (born 7 December 1961) and Eva Speakman (born 30 April 1969), known collectively as The Speakmans, are British writers, therapists, life coaches and TV presenters.

Career
Nik Speakman started a finance company, Personal Money Management, aged 17 and was working as a success coach at the time of his and Eva's 2005 appearance in That's Rich, a Granada Television series focusing on entrepreneurs in the north west of England. Eva Speakman ran the Heavenly Bodies gym in Oldham, at the time of the show.

The Speakmans were subsequently hosts of a Living TV show, A Life Coach Less Ordinary, and in 2007 published a book, You Can Be Fantastic, Too!. The couple hosted a television pilot for the American FOX network, Panic Attack, in 2010.

A second daytime television show, The Speakmans, was broadcast by ITV. In The Speakmans they attempted to 'successfully treat ordinary people with extraordinary problems'. The show aired for 20 episodes, beginning on 14 July 2014.

The couple are resident therapists on ITV's This Morning, hosting a segment about issues and anxiety disorders ranging from obsessive–compulsive disorder to fears, phobias and post-traumatic stress disorder.

The Speakmans use 'schema conditioning psychotherapy' to 'find and tackle the root cause of anxiety disorders'. Nik Speakman said of their approach on their television series that "We're really hoping people will look at it and think: 'I can apply that to my life.' Even if it's an entirely different problem, ultimately our therapy is the same...That's what we want. There's no need for anyone to suffer. There is absolute hope for everyone." The Speakmans also believe in "practising gratitude", asserting that "Everybody's got problems and issues but equally everybody has got amazing things to be thankful for."

Therapeutic techniques utilized by the couple include putting clients into a DeLorean sports car in order to 'travel 'back to the future' to confront past demons', a reference to the DeLorean time machine from the Back to the Future film series.

Noted celebrity clients of the Speakmans have included Vicky Pattison, Peter Andre, Kerry Katona, Kym Marsh, Liz McClarnon, Katie Price, Holly Willoughby and Jeremy Kyle.

The Speakmans have diplomas in an unspecified subject from Newcastle University, but have stated these are not related to their work.

The Speakmans developed their own therapy, Visual Schema Displacement Therapy (VSDT) and the first research study into this was carried out by academics at Utrecht University and Amsterdam University, who tested it against eye movement desensitization and reprocessing, which is recommended by the NHS as one of the main treatments for post-traumatic stress disorder. The results showed that VSDT was superior to both EMDR and a control condition.

In December 2015, The Speakmans appeared on BBC Radio 2's Breakfast Show with Sara Cox.

Personal life
The Speakmans have lived in Littleborough near Rochdale in Greater Manchester since 2000. The Speakmans converted their house from a former pub and restaurant into a nine-bedroomed house. The couple put their house up for sale in 2010 as they worked on the Panic Attack pilot in the United States, and planned to move to the south of England owing to their work in London and America.

The couple have two children, Olivia and Hunter, and are supporters of a local children's home, the Duke Bar Burnley Wood NCH Children's Centre, and are Celebrity Ambassadors of Variety Children's Charity.

Awards
In October 2017, the Speakmans were awarded a Legends of Industry Award for their contribution to the Therapeutic/Motivational Industry.

References

External links

20th-century births
Year of birth missing (living people)
Living people
Alumni of Newcastle University
English non-fiction writers
English television personalities
Life coaches
Married couples
People from Rochdale